São Pedro (Portuguese for Saint Peter) is the easternmost civil parish in the municipality of Ponta Delgada on the island of São Miguel in the archipelago of the Azores. It is part of the historic downtown of Ponta Delgada. The population in 2011 was 7,742, in an area of 2.89 km2. The parish was first incorporated in 1976.

History

The first inhabitants on the island of São Miguel were primarily farmers, and were granted tracts of land to cultivate. These small populations would eventually form the nucleus of the three main agglomerations in southern São Miguel: Matriz (São Sebastião), Santa Clara e São Jose, and São Pedro. In addition to agriculture, farmers were fishermen, complementing their seasonal activities and sheltered by the natural harbours in the regions.

By 1499, the population included the writer Pêro de Teive, who signed the document that elevated Ponta Delgada to status of town. In the 19th century, at the beginning of the Liberal Wars, the residence of Morgado do Canto became the residence for Dom Pedro, Duke of Bragança, when he disembarked and installed his Liberal faction in the Azores. From here, the Duke would travel to the other islands and gather forces before parting for the continent with 7,500 troops to combat the Miguelist faction. The departure occurred from Relvão, a zone that was later transformed into a public walkway and retained the title of Alameda da Liberdade or Alameda do Duque de Bragança.

Architecture

Civic
 Estate of the Baron of Laranjeiras
 Preparatory (School) Roberto Ivens
 Observatory Afonso Chaves

Religious
 Convent of Nossa Senhora da Graça
 Church of São Pedro
 Hermitage of Mãe de Deus
 Hermitage of São Gonçalo

Notable citizens
 Roberto Ivens (12 June 1850; São Pedro - 28 January 1898; Dafundo, Lisbon)

References

Parishes of Ponta Delgada